Those Boys! is a 1909 American silent short comedy film directed by D. W. Griffith.

Cast
 Anita Hendrie as The Mother
 Linda Arvidson as A Daughter
 Clara T. Bracy
 Florence Lawrence as The Maid
 Dorothy West as A Daughter

References

External links
 

1909 films
1909 comedy films
Silent American comedy films
American silent short films
American black-and-white films
Films directed by D. W. Griffith
1909 short films
American comedy short films
1900s American films